The yellow lance, scientific name Elliptio lanceolata, is a species of freshwater mussel, an aquatic bivalve mollusk in the family Unionidae, the river mussels.

This species is endemic to the United States.

References

Fauna of the United States
Elliptio
Bivalves described in 1828
Taxonomy articles created by Polbot